I'll Be Fine may also refer to:

Popular culture

In music

Albums
 I'll Be Fine, a 2001 album by Janita

Songs and singles
 "I'll Be Fine", a 2001 single by Janita
 "I'll Be Fine", a 1988 song by Rick Astley
 "I'll Be Fine", a song by Critical Mass
 "I'll Be Fine", a song by Emmet Swimming
 "I'll Be Fine", a song by The Copyrights
 "I'll Be Fine", a song by Juice WRLD
 "I'll Be Fine (Molly Pettersson Hammar song)", a 2015 song by Molly Pettersson Hammar